Isabel Lamberti is a Dutch film director who works in a hybrid of documentary and fiction.

Career
Lamberti is a graduate of film theory and directing programs at the New York University Tisch School of the Arts, and the Netherlands Film Academy. Her feature film debut is a Spanish-language film, La Última Primavera (The Last Days of Spring).  She won the New Directors’ Award at the 2020 San Sebastian Film Festival for her film Last  La Última Primavera. The subject of the film is a family that lives in Cañada Real in Madrid, the largest informal settlement in Europe. The film was selected for the 2020 edition of the ACID programme in Cannes.

Filmography

 Vuurrood - Documentary short, 2014 
 Volando Voy - Documentary short, 2015
 Amor - Short film, 2017
 Father - Short film, 2019
 Skam Netherlands - TV series (5 episodes), 2018
 Last Days of Spring (La Última Primavera) - 2020

References

Dutch film directors
Dutch women film directors
Tisch School of the Arts alumni
University of Amsterdam alumni
Living people
Year of birth missing (living people)